Lantana is an upscale census-designated place (CDP) and master-planned community originally developed by Republic Property Group,  south of Denton in unincorporated Denton County, Texas, United States. The population of the CDP at the 2010 census was 6,874. Lantana had 3,274 occupied homes as of December 31, 2015, with an estimated population of 10,641. Lantana shares the 76226 ZIP code of Argyle. Approximately one quarter of the populace have an annual household income of greater than $150,000, with 34% having incomes from $75,000-$150,000.  Almost half of the Lantana population has a bachelor's degree or higher. In 2004, 2006, 2011 and 2012, Lantana won the People's Choice Award for Community of the Year at the Dallas Homebuilders Association McSAM Awards.  Lantana hosts regular community events, such as outdoor music presentations in the parks, chili cook offs, festivals, picnics, and other similar functions for its residents.

Lantana encompasses . It was developed starting in 1999 on land acquired from the Rayzor family (known as Rayzor Ranch). On March 16, 2000, Republic Property broke ground on the community. Larkspur and Sandlin were the first neighborhoods developed. The first residents moved in on July 31, 2001. In the first quarter of 2014, Forestar Group, Inc, an original equity partner along with Republic Property Group, acquired the remaining partnership interest in Lantana and continued the final development of the community.

The homes in Lantana are built around an 18-hole golf course, designed by Jay Morrish. In October 2003, Lantana Golf Club became a semi-private facility. In October 2004, a 7,500 square-foot club house expansion was completed. The club went private in early 2009.

The Lantana Community Association, Lantana's HOA, is managed by Insight Association Management. HOA dues cover, security monitoring and system installation, front yard maintenance, and amenities. The Board of Directors of the Lantana Community Association are: Tara Boswell, Christi Brownlow and Darrel Amen. The Association is currently in the process of transitioning over to a Resident Board of Directors after the reaching the community size the state of Texas requires to do so. Lantana's monthly Board meetings are open to the public and take place in the Bartonville Town Square. Residents who have individual concerns  about their home or the community in general may present those items at the monthly meetings.

Lantana residents pay an annual fee, through the Lantana Community Association, to the Argyle Volunteer Fire Department (AVFD) for Fire and EMS service. The fee is based on the appraised value of each home and the rate charged by the AVFD.

Lantana is located in Development District #4, Fresh Water Supply District #6 and Fresh Water Supply District #7. A Fresh Water Supply District (FWSD) is a political subdivision of the State of Texas, authorized by the Texas Commission of Environmental Quality, to provide water, sewage, drainage and other services within the district's boundaries.

The number of local retail destinations is increasing within Lantana. The first development took place at the southeastern area of the community at the northwestern corner of the intersection of FM407 (Justin Rd.) and Copper Canyon Rd. Currently, CVS, Pizza Hut, Sonic Drive-In, Lantana Dry Cleaners, Kwik Kar Oil and Lube, Kwik Kar Car Wash and Primrose School of Lantana are open for business. A small retail center is under construction at the northeast corner of FM407 and Simmons Rd. At the southwestern corner of the community along FM407 between Jeter Rd. and McMakin Rd., NewQuest properties is constructing Lantana Town Center. Anchored by a Kroger Marketplace grocery store with a Fuel Center on the western side of the project, initial plans show several small retail stores along with restaurants. The Kroger Fuel center was opened February 2015 and the Kroger Marketplace opened on May 22, 2015. Several restaurants and stores have already opened within Lantana Town Center.

The publicly elected Board of Directors manages and controls all of the affairs of the district, subject to the continuing supervision of the Texas Commission of Environmental Quality. The Board establishes policies in the interest of its residents and utility customers. A district may adopt and enforce all necessary charges, fees and taxes in order to provide facilities and service.

Four of Denton ISD's schools are located within the community: Tom Harpool Middle School and Annie Blanton Elementary School, which opened in August 2008, Eugenia Porter Rayzor Elementary, which was the first school to be built and opened in August 2002, and Dorothy Adkins Elementary School, which opened in August 2014. Blanton and EP Rayzor elementary schools are rated "Exemplary" and the middle school is rated "Recognized."

Lantana is divided into subdivisions or neighborhoods listed below:

Lantana has a sky/weather camera overlooking the park and pool in Larkspur subdivision. It's often seen on KDFW during the weather segment.

Education
It is zoned to the Denton Independent School District.

Elementary schools serving sections include: Adkins Elementary School (in the CDP), E. P. Rayzor Elementary School (in the CDP), and Blanton Elementary School.

All portions are zoned to Harpool Middle School, and Guyer High School.

The majority of Denton County, Lantana included, is in the boundary of North Central Texas College.

References

Census-designated places in Denton County, Texas
Census-designated places in Texas
Dallas–Fort Worth metroplex
Populated places established in 2001